Gustavo Dávila (July 9, 1985 – June 30, 2014) was a Colombian football midfielder. His last club was Patriotas.

Death
On 30 June 2014, Dávila drowned in the Guachinte River near Jamundí.

References

1985 births
2014 deaths
Footballers from Cali
Colombian footballers
Association football midfielders
Categoría Primera A players
Envigado F.C. players
Águilas Doradas Rionegro players
Atlético Bucaramanga footballers
Cortuluá footballers
Patriotas Boyacá footballers
Accidental deaths in Colombia
Deaths by drowning